Balclutha, also known as Star of Alaska, Pacific Queen, or Sailing Ship Balclutha, is a steel-hulled full-rigged ship that was built in 1886.  She is representative of several different commercial ventures, including lumber, salmon, and grain.  She is a U.S. National Historic Landmark and is currently preserved at the San Francisco Maritime National Historical Park in San Francisco, California.  She was added to the National Register of Historic Places on 7 November 1976.

History
Balclutha was built in 1886 by Charles Connell and Company of Scotstoun in Glasgow, Scotland, for Robert McMillan, of Dumbarton, Scotland. Her namesake is said to be the eponymous town of Balclutha, New Zealand, but her name also refers to her first homeport, Glasgow, Scotland, which is a "City on the Clyde" - the meaning of her name derived from the Gaelic Baile Chluaidh. Designed as a general trader, Balclutha rounded Cape Horn 17 times in thirteen years.

During this period she carried cargoes such as wine, case oil, and coal from Europe and the East Coast of the United States to various ports in the Pacific. These included Chile for nitrate, Australia and New Zealand for wool, Burma for rice, San Francisco for grain, and the Pacific Northwest for timber.

In 1899 Balclutha transferred to the registry of Hawaii, and traded timber from the Pacific Northwest to Australia, returning to San Francisco with Australian coal.

In 1902 Balclutha was chartered to the Alaska Packers' Association (APA). After having struck a reef off of Sitkinak Island near Kodiak Island on 16 May 1904, she was renamed the Star of Alaska when bought by APA for merely $500. After extended repairs she joined the salmon fishing trade, sailing north from the San Francisco area to the Chignik Bay, Alaska, in April with supplies, fishermen, and cannery workers, and returned in September with a cargo of canned salmon.

For this trade she carried over 200 crew and passengers, as compared to the 26-man crew she carried as the Balclutha. In 1911 the poop deck was extended to the main mast to accommodate Italian and Scandinavian workers. This expansion is called the shelter deck. In the 'tween deck, bunks for Chinese workers were built. Her last voyage in this trade was in 1930, when she then was laid up after her return home.

In 1933, Star of Alaska was renamed Pacific Queen by her new owner Frank Kissinger. In this guise she appeared in the film Mutiny on the Bounty starring Clark Gable and Charles Laughton. She then eked out an existence as an exhibition ship, gradually deteriorating, and was for a while exhibited as a "pirate ship".

In 1954, Pacific Queen was acquired by the San Francisco Maritime Museum, which restored her and renamed her Balclutha and moored her at Pier 41 East. In 1985 she was designated a National Historic Landmark.

In 1988, she was moved to her present mooring at Hyde Street Pier of the San Francisco Maritime National Historical Park. She previously hosted a monthly Chantey Sing in the shelter deck, which has moved to the adjacent Eureka.

Image gallery

See also
 List of large sailing vessels

Sources

, retrieved 23:40 GMT 22 January 2005
 Entry in Houghton Mifflin's Ships of the World (registration required), retrieved 23:50 GMT 22 January 2005

External links

Balclutha history - San Francisco Maritime National Historical Park
Balclutha - BlooSee.com
Comedian Jonathan Winters Detained In San Francisco. Winters was arrested in 1949, after climbing in the rigging of the Balclutha.

San Francisco Maritime National Historical Park
Tall ships of the United Kingdom
Tall ships of the United States
Victorian-era merchant ships of the United Kingdom
Museum ships in San Francisco
Museum ships in California
Individual sailing vessels
Windjammers
Three-masted ships
Historic American Engineering Record in San Francisco
National Historic Landmarks in the San Francisco Bay Area
Sail training ships
Ships built on the River Clyde
1886 ships
National Register of Historic Places in San Francisco
Ships on the National Register of Historic Places in California
Full-rigged ships
Fisherman's Wharf, San Francisco